Michael Blackburn (born 27 May 1970 in Sydney, New South Wales) is an Australian Olympic medallist, sailor and coach. He is well known for his crossing of Bass Strait in a Laser dinghy. He did so on 9 March 2005 in a record time (for sailing) of 13 hours 1 minute.

In March 2005, he was ranked 3rd in the world in the Laser, behind Robert Scheidt of Brazil and Paul Goodison of Great Britain, and ahead of Mark Mendelblatt of the United States.

Blackburn also won the 2006 Laser World Championships in Jeju, Korea. He placed 9th at the 2004 Summer Olympics in Athens, Greece. He won a bronze medal in the 2000 Summer Olympics in Sydney, Australia.

Blackburn has coached three Gold medalists in three Olympics: He was coach of Australian Olympic Gold medalist Tom Slingsby in the Laser class at the 2012 Summer Olympics in London. He followed this by coaching Tom Burton to gold in the Laser class at the 2016 Summer Olympics. In 2021, he coached Matt Wearn to Gold in the Laser class at the 2020 Summer Olympics.

In 2016 and 2019, he was named Coach of the Year at the Australian Institute of Sport Performance Awards.

Outside of sailing, Blackburn has a PhD in Human Movement Studies and was an Australian Institute of Sport scholarship holder.

References

External links
 
 
 
 Sports Mind Skills products
 Bass Strait Laser documentary

1970 births
Living people
Australian male sailors (sport)
Laser class world champions
Olympic sailors of Australia
Olympic bronze medalists for Australia
Olympic medalists in sailing
Sailors at the 1996 Summer Olympics – Laser
Sailors at the 2000 Summer Olympics – Laser
Sailors at the 2004 Summer Olympics – Laser
Australian Institute of Sport sailors
Sportsmen from New South Wales
Sailors from Sydney
Medalists at the 2000 Summer Olympics
World champions in sailing for Australia
20th-century Australian people
21st-century Australian people